Dukuh Atas TOD ( or KBT Dukuh Atas) is a transit-oriented development at Central Jakarta and South Jakarta, Indonesia. This is built as part of constructing several other transit oriented development across Jakarta to facilitate commuters to transfer between different mode of public transportation.

The development includes  station of Jakarta MRT, Sudirman station of KRL Commuterline, BNI City of Airport Rail Link and Transjakarta bus service.  By 2023, it will also include Dukuh Atas station of Greater Jakarta LRT. It spreads from Jl. Kendal beside Sudirman station in Central Jakarta through underpass to Jl. Blora and Jl. Tanjung Karang. The area has been designated as the main transit point for Central Jakarta.

Development
There is a park on the western slope of Jalan Jenderal Sudirman down to Jl. Tanjung Karang, under which  station of Jakarta MRT is located. From the Dukuh Atas BNI MRT station point, a 700 meters pedestrian route connects Kendal Road to Blora street. 

A transit plaza is now under-construction, which will be a 20-story building that will house the MRT office and other facilities.

Transportation

References

central Jakarta
Transport in Jakarta
Transit-oriented developments